The Snow Hawk is a 1925 film directed by Scott Pembroke and Joe Rock and starring Stan Laurel.

Cast
 Stan Laurel - Mountie
 Glen Cavender - Midnight Mike
 Julie Leonard - Storekeeper's daughter

See also
 List of American films of 1925
 Stan Laurel filmography

References

External links

1925 films
1925 comedy films
1925 short films
American silent short films
American black-and-white films
Films directed by Joe Rock
Films directed by Scott Pembroke
Silent American comedy films
American comedy short films
1920s American films